William Garvin (born 1835) was an American sailor who fought in the American Civil War. Garvin received his country's highest award for bravery during combat, the Medal of Honor. Garvin's medal was won for his actions during the First Battle of Fort Fisher on board the U.S.S. Agawam. He was posthumously honored with the award on December 31, 1864.

Garvin was from Canada and entered service in Plymouth, Connecticut. Garvin was one of 30 Canadians to win the Medal of Honor.

Medal of Honor citation

See also

List of American Civil War Medal of Honor recipients: G–L

References

1835 births
Year of death unknown
19th-century Canadian people
19th-century American naval officers
American Civil War recipients of the Medal of Honor
Pre-Confederation Canadian emigrants to the United States
Canadian-born Medal of Honor recipients
People of Connecticut in the American Civil War
Union Navy officers
United States Navy Medal of Honor recipients
Military personnel from Connecticut
People from Plymouth, Connecticut